Vladimir Vladimirovich Sugrobov (born 10 September 1996) is a Russian football player who plays for SKA-Khabarovsk.

Career

Club
Sugrobov made his debut in the Russian Football National League for FC Sokol Saratov on 21 August 2016 in a game against FC Khimki.

He made his debut for FC Anzhi Makhachkala early in the first leg 2017–18 Russian Premier League relegation play-off game against FC Yenisey Krasnoyarsk as the first- and second-choice goalkeepers of Anzhi were injured.

On 10 February 2019, Anzhi Makhachkala announced that Sugrobov had left the club to join Baltika Kaliningrad.

On 1 June 2019, he joined Russian Premier League club Tambov.

On 17 January 2020, Sugrobov joined FC Pyunik on loan for the remainder of the 2019–20 season.

On 27 July 2020, he signed a 1-year contract with SKA-Khabarovsk.

Career statistics

Club

References

External links
 Profile by Russian Football National League

1996 births
Sportspeople from Saratov
Living people
Russian footballers
Association football goalkeepers
FC Sokol Saratov players
FC Ararat Moscow players
FC Anzhi Makhachkala players
FC Baltika Kaliningrad players
FC Tambov players
FC Pyunik players
FC SKA-Khabarovsk players
Russian First League players
Russian Second League players
Armenian Premier League players
Russian expatriate footballers
Expatriate footballers in Armenia
Russian expatriate sportspeople in Armenia